Monte Cinto is the highest mountain on the island of Corsica, a region of France.

Geography 
It is the highest peak of the Monte Cinto massif, one of the four main massifs in Corsica.

Its location gives it a theoretical panorama of mountains on mainland Europe stretching from near Marseille to Rome.

History 
The first known ascent of Monte Cinto was on 6 June 1882, by a party led by Édouard Rochat who reached the summit via the mountain's southern slopes. On 26 May 1883 a party led by the English mountaineer Francis Fox Tuckett, and including the French guide François Devouassoud and the landscape painter Edward Theodore Compton, also ascended the mountain by the pass that now bears Tuckett's name.

Today, the GR 20 hiking trail passes close to Monte Cinto, and walkers can make a short detour to the summit.

See also
 List of European ultra prominent peaks
 List of islands by highest point

References

External links
 Computer generated digital panoramas from Monte Cinto: North South
 More information and trip report
 "Monte Cinto, France" on Peakbagger

Mountains of Haute-Corse
Two-thousanders of France